Wren house may refer to
 a wren house, see nest box
 Wren House at Kensington Palace

See also
 House wren, a small songbird of the wren family